Milacron is an American limited liability company that manufactures and distributes plastic processing equipment for fields such as injection molding and extrusion molding. Milacron is one of many operating companies that make up Hillenbrand, Inc. Hillenbrand acquired Milacron in November 2019.

History

Reincorporated in 1970 from the Cincinnati Milling Machine Company, Milacron has grown over the years. 
With the acquisition of 
- the Extruderbuilding companies Anger AGM Linz and Anger APM Vienna (Austria) in 1969.

Together with the existing Injection Molding Machines production, it was the basis for "50 years in plastic".

- Ferromatik in 1993, DME (Detroit Mold Engineering) in 1996, and Industrial Machine Sales, Inc. (IMSI) along with its sister company Precise Plastics Machinery (PPM) in 2014.

Brand Names
The following are brands of Milacron:
 Ferromatik
 Canterbury
 Genca

Heritage Brands
 Cincinnati Milacron
 Servtek
 Wear Technology

References

1970 establishments in Ohio
Plastics companies of the United States
Tool manufacturing companies of the United States
Companies listed on the New York Stock Exchange
Manufacturing companies based in Ohio
Chemical companies established in 1970
Chemical companies of the United States